The Barnstable County Correctional Facility is the county jail for Barnstable County. It was opened in 2004, replacing an earlier structure from the 1930s. The building also houses the Barnstable County Sheriff's Office. Sheriff, James M. Cummings hired former Massachusetts 10th district congressional candidate, Jeff Perry as "special sheriff" on 25 January 25, 2011. The facility is located within the established boundaries of Massachusetts Military Reservation, though it is outside the gated and fenced security perimeter and is thus accessible by the general public.

References

External links
Sheriff's office homepage

2004 establishments in Massachusetts
Bourne, Massachusetts
Buildings and structures in Barnstable County, Massachusetts
County government buildings in Massachusetts
Government buildings completed in 2004
Prisons in Massachusetts